Gowravargal is a 2010 Tamil-language  action film written and directed by Sanjay Ram and produced by Ma. Paramasivam. The film stars Sathyaraj, Vignesh, and Monica, while Ranjith and Kuyili play supporting roles. The music was composed by Dhina. The film released to poor reviews and poor collections on 15 October 2010.

Plot
Ganesan (Vignesh) is an irresponsible youth in a village. He promises his mother (Kuyili) that he would be good and start earning. He joins a job where he bashes a few wrong-doers. This impresses a do-gooder and don named Thondaiman (Sathyaraj), who urges Ganesan to join him for work. Thondaiman is respected a lot, for he provides justice to people in his own way. People in case of crisis approach him and not the police. Ganesan, impressed by Thondaiman's ways, develops an affinity with him and even decides to give his life for him. Meanwhile, Ganesan falls in love with Poonkodi (Monica). A turn of events leaves a local minister's son going crazy behind her. Enters a police officer (Ranjith), who plays spoilsport in their romance. He threatens Thondaiman and hatches a conspiracy to ensure that Thondaiman and Ganesan part ways, but things happen otherwise.

Cast

Soundtrack
The music was composed by Dhina.

References

External links
 

2010 films
2010s Tamil-language films
Films directed by Sanjay Ram